VSB-TV (channel 11) was a television station in Hamilton, Bermuda, which served the British territory as an affiliate of the American network NBC. The station was owned by the DeFontes Group, a Bermuda-based company which also owned and operated radio stations on the island.

On August 31, 2014, VSB-TV ceased broadcasting over the air due to financial difficulties; it had not launched digital operations in ATSC, Bermuda's digital television format. The news operation continued online for one more year before DeFontes completely ceased operations.

Programming and newscasts
VSB's schedule ran an hour ahead of the Eastern Time Zone without any delays, which meant prime time began at 9:00 p.m. Atlantic Time and Today began live at 8:00 a.m. AT, with the late local news carried at midnight AT. The station also ran Access Hollywood Live and The Ellen DeGeneres Show.

Other station newscasts were carried at 7:00 p.m. AT and 8:30 p.m. AT, with the NBC Nightly News airing live at 7:30 p.m. AT.

Discontinuation of operations
On August 29, 2014, the ownership of VSB announced that over-the-air broadcasting would be suspended indefinitely due to financial losses, effective August 31, 2014, whilst expressing the hope that the station might reorganize and return to the air in the future. Declining advertising revenues resulting in continual deficits were cited by DeFontes Group. A daily 20-min. video streaming of VSB News Online continued for another year, produced by VSB staff.

On September 1, 2015, it was announced that Defontes Group would cease all remaining operations and lay off all 19 of its staff. The station's news director said, "declining advertising revenues concurrent with the explosion of electronic media had been our death knell", when DeFontes Broadcasting ceased operations completely on September 30, 2015, including its radio stations and online streaming.

References

External links
 

Television channels and stations established in 1991
Television channels and stations disestablished in 2014
1991 establishments in Bermuda
2014 disestablishments in Bermuda
Transnational network affiliates